William Jolliffe (1660–1750) was MP for Petersfield from 1734 to 1741.

Jolliffe was the eldest son of John Jolliffe, M.P.  for Heytesbury in the Convention Parliament and his wife Rebecca née Boothby. He was returned as a Whig in the interest of his nephew John Jolliffe.

References

18th-century English people
Whig (British political party) MPs for English constituencies
British MPs 1734–1741
1660 births
1750 deaths